Harutaeographa babai is a moth of the family Noctuidae. It is found in Nepal (Himalaya).

References

Moths described in 1994
Orthosiini